Hunter Johnson (April 14, 1906 – August 27, 1998) was an American composer. His compositions include a piano sonata and the orchestral music for Martha Graham's ballets Letter to the World, based on the life and poetry of Emily Dickinson, and Deaths and Entrances. His musical style was a combination of neoclassic, neoromantic, and nationalist.

Johnson was born near Benson, North Carolina. He attended Benson High School and the University of North Carolina at Chapel Hill before leaving the state to finish his undergraduate studies at the Eastman School of Music in 1929. UNC later awarded him an honorary doctorate. He taught at the University of Michigan (1929–33), the University of Manitoba (1944–47), Cornell (1948–53), the University of Illinois (1959–65) and the University of Texas (1966–71). He retired in 1971 and returned to the family farm in Benson. He was the first composer laureate of North Carolina, an award he received in 1991.

Footnotes

References

Albany Records product information
Database of Recorded American Music article
Monaco, Richard A. (1960), "The Music of Hunter Johnson". Ph.D. diss. Ithaca: Cornell University.
Monaco, Richard A., and Michael Meckna (2001). "Johnson, Hunter". The New Grove Dictionary of Music and Musicians, edited by Stanley Sadie and John Tyrrell. New York: Grove's Dictionaries.

External links
Interview with Hunter Johnson, September 5, 1987

1906 births
1998 deaths
American male composers
Cornell University faculty
People from Benson, North Carolina
University of North Carolina at Chapel Hill alumni
Eastman School of Music alumni
University of Michigan faculty
Academic staff of the University of Manitoba
University of Illinois faculty
University of Texas faculty
Musicians from North Carolina
20th-century American composers
20th-century American male musicians